Leucotenes is a genus of moths belonging to the family Tortricidae.

Species
Leucotenes coprosmae (Dugdale, 1988)

Etymology
The genus name is derived from the Greek leukos (meaning white) and tenes, a conventional suffix for tortricids.

See also
List of Tortricidae genera

References

External links
tortricidae.com

Archipini
Tortricidae genera